Alfred Tischendorf (born 26 November 1934) is a German wrestler. He competed in the men's freestyle welterweight at the 1956 Summer Olympics.

References

External links
 

1934 births
Living people
German male sport wrestlers
Olympic wrestlers of the United Team of Germany
Wrestlers at the 1956 Summer Olympics
Sportspeople from Thuringia